Bernard Quarles (born January 4, 1960, in Los Angeles, California) was a quarterback for the National Football League and Canadian Football League.

Career
Quarles played quarterback while attending Jefferson High School in Los Angeles. He played for the Calgary Stampeders from 1983 to 1984, followed by the Ottawa Rough Riders and the Saskatchewan Roughriders. He also served as a replacement player for the Los Angeles Rams during the 1987 NFL strike.

References

Living people
1960 births
Jefferson High School (Los Angeles) alumni
American players of Canadian football
American football quarterbacks
Canadian football quarterbacks
Calgary Stampeders players
Los Angeles Rams players
Players of American football from Los Angeles
UCLA Bruins football players
Hawaii Rainbow Warriors football players
National Football League replacement players
Players of Canadian football from Los Angeles